Joaquín Sabriá Pitarch (born 22 August 1961) is a Spanish rowing coxswain. He competed in the men's coxed pair event at the 1984 Summer Olympics.

References

1961 births
Living people
Spanish male rowers
Olympic rowers of Spain
Rowers at the 1984 Summer Olympics
Rowers from Barcelona
Coxswains (rowing)